When the Tingle Becomes a Chill is the twenty-seventh solo studio album by American country music singer-songwriter Loretta Lynn. It was released on February 2, 1976, by MCA Records.

Commercial performance 
The album peaked at No. 6 on the Billboard Top Country Albums chart. The album's first single, "When the Tingle Becomes a Chill", peaked at No. 2 on the Billboard Hot Country Songs chart. The second single, "Red, White and Blue", peaked at No. 20.

Recording 
Recording sessions for the album took place at Bradley's Barn in Mount Juliet, TN, on January 30, July 11 and October 1, 1975. "Red, White and Blue" is the only song that has ever been released from the January 30, 1975 session. A total of five songs were from previous recording sessions. "Turn Me Anyway But Loose" and "Leaning on Your Love" were recorded during sessions for 1973's Love Is the Foundation on March 5 and May 31, 1973, respectively. Two songs were from sessions for 1974's They Don't Make 'Em Like My Daddy, "You Love You" was recorded on March 5, 1973, and "When the Tingle Becomes a Chill" was recorded on August 29, 1974. "All I Want from You Is Away" was recorded on December 19, 1974, during a session for 1975's Back to the Country.

Track listing

Personnel 
Adapted from album liner notes.
Harold Bradley – bass
Owen Bradley – producer
Johnny Christopher – guitar
Johnny Gimble – fiddle
Lloyd Green – steel guitar
The Jordanaires – backing vocals
Mike Leech – bass
Kenny Malone – drums
Grady Martin – guitar
Charlie McCoy – harmonica/vibes
The Nashville Edition – backing vocals
Hargus Robbins – piano
Hal Rugg – steel guitar
Pete Wade – guitar

Chart positions 
Album – Billboard (North America)

Singles – Billboard (North America)

References 

1976 albums
Loretta Lynn albums
Albums produced by Owen Bradley
MCA Records albums